Qubaisi is a sub-tribe of Bani Yas, of Abu Dhabi, closely associated with the Bani Yas of Abu Dhabi. The Al Qubaisi family share close relations with the leading royal family of the United Arab Emirates through Salama bint Butti Al-Qubaisi mother of Sheikh Zayed bin Sultan Al Nahyan the, founder of the UAE.

Notable Members

Sheikha Salama bint Butti Al-Qubaisi (? - 1970), Mother of Sheikh Zayed bin Sultan Al Nahyan
 Saeed Rashid Al Qubaisi, Emirati judoka
 Khaled Al Qubaisi, Emirati businessman
 Amna Al Qubaisi, Emirati racing driver
 Hamda Al Qubaisi, Emirati racing driver
 Khadem al-Qubaisi, Emirati businessman
 Rashid Al Qubaisi, Emirati golfer
Mohamed nejm Al Qubaisi, Emirati businessman 
Ahmed Abdrahim al QubaisiEmirati soldier 

Arabic-language surnames